"Georgia" is a single by Southern hip hop duo Field Mob and Atlanta-based rapper Ludacris featuring R&B singer Jamie Foxx, with production by DJ Vudu Spellz. It first appeared on Ludacris Presents: Disturbing tha Peace, a compilation album released by Ludacris' own Disturbing tha Peace record label, showcasing the company's new talent as of 2006. The track was reprised on the Field Mob album Light Poles and Pine Trees released later the same year.

In the original radio version of the song, the background chorus was a sampling of Ray Charles' "Georgia On My Mind".  Appropriately, because he portrayed him in the film Ray, Jamie Foxx performed Charles' parts on the version that appeared on the subsequent albums and video. However, despite being featured in the chorus, Foxx was absent from the music video.

"Georgia" reached #39 on US Hot 100 and #31 on the US R&B/Hip-Hop chart.

A remix by Lil Wayne with lyrics focusing on the Hurricane Katrina disaster appeared on his mixtape Dedication 2.

Track listing
 "Georgia" (Clean version)
 "Georgia" (A capella)
 "Gettin' Some" (Clean version)
 "Gettin' Some" (Main version)
 "Gettin' Some" (Instrumental)

Charts

Certifications

External links

2005 singles
Field Mob songs
Jamie Foxx songs
Ludacris songs
Songs about Georgia (U.S. state)
Songs written by Ludacris
Songs with music by Hoagy Carmichael